General elections were held in Saint Kitts and Nevis on 21 March 1989. The result was a victory for the People's Action Movement (PAM), which won six of the eleven directly-elected seats. The ruling majority coalition of PAM and the Nevis Reformation Party continued as a result of the elections.

Results

References

Saint Kitts
Elections in Saint Kitts and Nevis
General